Alfred Cuthbert (December 23, 1785July 9, 1856) was a United States representative and Senator from Georgia. He should not be confused with his brother, John Alfred Cuthbert.

Life and career
Cuthbert was born in Savannah. He was instructed by private tutors and graduated from Princeton College in 1803. He studied law and was admitted to the state bar about 1805 but did not practice.

In 1809, he was captain of a company of volunteer infantry, and was a member of the Georgia House of Representatives from 1810 to 1813. Cuthbert was elected as a Democratic-Republican Representative to the Thirteenth Congress to fill the vacancy caused by the resignation of William W. Bibb, and was reelected to the Fourteenth Congress and served from December 13, 1813, to November 9, 1816, when he resigned. He was a member of the Georgia Senate from 1817 to 1819, and was elected to the Seventeenth, Eighteenth, and Nineteenth Congresses, serving from March 4, 1821, to March 3, 1827.

He was not a candidate for renomination in 1826, but was elected as a Democrat to the U.S. Senate to fill the vacancy caused by the resignation of John Forsyth; he was reelected in 1837, and served from January 12, 1835, to March 3, 1843. Cuthbert was not a candidate for reelection in 1843, and retired from active business pursuits and lived on his estate near Monticello in Jasper County until his death in 1856; interment was in Summerville Cemetery, Augusta, Georgia.

External links

1785 births
1856 deaths
Politicians from Savannah, Georgia
Democratic-Republican Party members of the United States House of Representatives from Georgia (U.S. state)
Jacksonian members of the United States House of Representatives from Georgia (U.S. state)
Jacksonian United States senators from Georgia (U.S. state)
Democratic Party United States senators from Georgia (U.S. state)
Democratic Party members of the Georgia House of Representatives
Democratic Party Georgia (U.S. state) state senators
American slave owners
United States senators who owned slaves